Lyndhurst, also known as the Jay Gould estate, is a Gothic Revival country house that sits in its own  park beside the Hudson River in Tarrytown, New York, about a half mile south of the Tappan Zee Bridge on US 9. The house was designated a National Historic Landmark in 1966.

History
The home was designed in 1838 by Alexander Jackson Davis, and owned in succession by New York City mayor William Paulding Jr., merchant George Merritt, and railroad tycoon Jay Gould.

Paulding named his house "Knoll", although critics quickly dubbed it "Paulding's Folly" because of its unusual design that includes fanciful turrets and asymmetrical outline. Its limestone exterior was quarried at Sing Sing in present-day Ossining, New York.

Merritt, the house's second owner, engaged Davis as his architect, and in 1864–1865 doubled the size of the house, renaming it "Lyndenhurst" after the estate's linden trees. Davis' new north wing included an imposing four-story tower, a new porte-cochere (the old one was reworked as a glass-walled vestibule), a new dining room, two bedrooms and servants' quarters.

Gould purchased the property in 1880 to use as a country house, shortened its name to "Lyndhurst" and occupied it until his death in 1892. In 1961, Gould's daughter Anna Gould donated it to the National Trust for Historic Preservation. The house is now open to the public.

Architecture

Lyndhurst's rooms are strongly Gothic in character.  Hallways are narrow, windows small and sharply arched, and ceilings are fantastically peaked, vaulted, and ornamented. The effect is at once gloomy, somber, and highly romantic; the large, double-height art gallery provides a contrast of light and space.

The house sits within a landscape park, designed in the English naturalistic style by Ferdinand Mangold, whom Merritt hired. Mangold drained the surrounding swamps, created lawns, planted specimen trees, and built a conservatory. The park is an outstanding example of 19th-century landscape design with a curving entrance drive that reveals "surprise" views of rolling lawns accented with shrubs and specimen trees. The  onion-domed, iron-framed, glass conservatory was one of the largest privately owned greenhouses in the United States when constructed.

In popular culture
ABC's holiday television film The Halloween That Almost Wasn't (1979), a.k.a. The Night Dracula Saved the World, was shot here. The scenes were used as the backdrop for both Count Dracula and the Witch's castle. It later aired on the Disney Channel during its Halloween season, until the late 1990s. 
From 1992 until the program changed filming locations from New York to Los Angeles in 2009,  Lyndhurst served as the exterior of “Wildwind,” the home of Dimitri Marick, in establishing shots on the ABC daytime drama All My Children.  Elements of Lyndhurst's interior architecture influenced the design of the Wildwind sets.
Lyndhurst was the set for the movies House of Dark Shadows (1970) and Night of Dark Shadows (1971), both based on the gothic soap opera Dark Shadows. It is also seen in  Reversal of Fortune (1990) and Gloria (1999). 
The History Channel's The Men Who Built America filmed at Lyndhurst in the summer of 2012.
Winter's Tale (2013) was filmed at Lyndhurst in January 2013. 
Lyndhurst was featured on Season 1, Episode 3 of Travel Channel's Castle Secrets & Legends series (original airdate February 9, 2014).
Lyndhurst was also used as a filming location for ABC's Forever in 2014, using the cottage on the property for exterior shots.
Lyndhurst's landscape, bowling alley, and mansion interior were used as a filming location for NBC's The Blacklist, starring James Spader.
In 2017, the Lifetime series Project Runway filmed an episode at Lyndhurst, challenging the designers to draw inspiration from the exteriors and gardens.
The 2021 and 2022 Westminster Kennel Club Dog Show was held outdoors at Lyndhurst on account of concerns about the COVID-19 pandemic in New York City.
Lyndhurst serves as a filming location for The Gilded Age (TV series). The mansion interior serves as the home of the character Aurora Fane and her husband and the Lyndhurst Carriage House is the location of the New York Globe Offices. Season 1 also featured the Lyndhurst grounds and greenhouse. The ferry terminal in the series' premiere episode was modeled after the Lyndhurst Bowling Alley.

Gallery

See also
List of National Historic Landmarks in New York
National Register of Historic Places listings in northern Westchester County, New York

References
Notes

Further reading
Dwyer, Michael Middleton, editor (2001) Great Houses of the Hudson River, Preface by Mark Rockefeller. Boston, Massachusetts: Little, Brown and Company in association with Historic Hudson Valley .

External links

Official website

Houses on the National Register of Historic Places in New York (state)
National Historic Landmarks in New York (state)
National Register of Historic Places in Westchester County, New York
Gothic Revival architecture in New York (state)
Houses completed in 1838
Tarrytown, New York
U.S. Route 9
Alexander Jackson Davis buildings
Historic house museums in Westchester County, New York
Gould, Jay
Hudson River Valley National Heritage Area
Historic American Buildings Survey in New York (state)
National Trust for Historic Preservation
Gould family residences
Dark Shadows
Gilded Age mansions